The 1974–75 BBC2 Floodlit Trophy was the tenth occasion on which the BBC2 Floodlit Trophy competition had been held. A new name was put on the trophy when Salford won by beating Warrington by the score of 10-5 in a replay. The final was played at The Willows, Salford, (historically in the county of Lancashire). The attendance was 4,473, receipts were £1913 and the score 0-0. The replay was at Wilderspool. The attendance was 5,778, receipts were £2434 and the score 10-5. This was the first (and only) floodlit final to require a replay after a drawn first match.

Background 
This season saw New Hunslet join the competition, which increased the number of entrants by one, to a new high total of twenty-two. The format remained the same as the last season with the preliminary round (generally) played on a two-legged home and away basis and the rest of the tournament being played on a knock-out basis. The exceptions to the two-legged preliminary rounds were the two matches where the four clubs had agreed to play a sudden-death match to avoid fixture congestion. The preliminary round now involved twelve clubs, to reduce the numbers taking part in the competition proper to just sixteen.

Competition and results

Preliminary round – first leg 
Involved  6 matches and 12 clubs

Preliminary round – second leg 
Involved  4 matches and the same 8 Clubs in reverse fixtures (the  other two matches were on a single leg basis)

Round 1 – first round 
Involved  8 matches and 16 clubs

Round 2 – quarter finals 
Involved 4 matches with 8 clubs

Round 3 – semi-finals  
Involved 2 matches and 4 clubs

Final

Final – replay

Teams and scorers 

Scoring - Try = three (3) points - Goal = two (2) points - Drop goal = two (2) points

The road to success 
This tree excludes any preliminary round fixtures

Notes and comments 
1 * The John Player Yearbook 1975–76  gives the attendance as 3,500, but the official St. Helens archives  gives it as 3,272
2 * No return leg - both teams agreed to a single sudden-death match to avoid fixture congestion
3 * This match was televised
4 * The John Player Yearbook 1975–76  gives the attendance as 3,600, but the official St. Helens archives  gives it as 3,576
5 * Dewsbury, who joined the  competition in season 1973–74, play their first game at home in the competition
6 * New Hunslet join the competition and play first game in the competition, and first at home in the competition
7 * The John Player Yearbook 1975–76  gives the attendance as 3,500, but the official St. Helens archives  gives it as 4,474
8 * The Rothmans Rugby League Yearbook 1990-1991 and 1991-92  and the RUGBYLEAGUEprojects as gives it 4,473 but the John Player Yearbook 1975–76  as 4,479
9 * The Willows was the home ground of Salford with a final capacity of 11,363 which included 2,500 seats. The record attendance was 26,470 on 13 February 1937 in the Challenge Cup first round match  vs Warrington. The final match played on 11 September 2011 at The Willows attracted 10,146 spectators to a Super League match which saw Salford lose 18-44 to Catalans Dragons, a record for a Salford home match in Super League
a * An unusual occurrence, a "seven point try", Salford's first score was a try by winger Keith Fielding, converted by David Watkins, followed by a penalty goal kicked by David Watkins awarded because Fielding had been fouled after scoring.
b * The Rothmans Rugby League Yearbook 1990-1991 and 1991-92  and the RUGBYLEAGUEprojects xxx as gives it 5,578 but the John Player Yearbook 1975–76  as 5,748
c * Wilderspool was the home ground of Warrington from 1883 to the end of the 2003 Summer season when they moved into the new purpose built Halliwell Jones Stadium. Wilderspool remained as a sports/Ruugby League ground and is/was used by Woolston Rovers/Warrington Wizards junior club. 
The ground had a final capacity of 9,000 although the record attendance was set in a Challenge cup third round match on 13 March 1948 when 34,304 spectators saw Warrington lose to Wigan 10-13.

General information for those unfamiliar 
The Rugby League BBC2 Floodlit Trophy was a knock-out competition sponsored by the BBC and between rugby league clubs, entrance to which was conditional upon the club having floodlights. Most matches were played on an evening, and those of which the second half was televised, were played on a Tuesday evening.
Despite the competition being named as 'Floodlit', many matches took place during the afternoons and not under floodlights, and several of the entrants, including  Barrow and Bramley did not have adequate lighting. And, when in 1973, due to the world oil crisis, the government restricted the use of floodlights in sport, all the matches, including the Trophy final, had to be played in the afternoon rather than at night.
The Rugby League season always (until the onset of "Summer Rugby" in 1996) ran from around August-time through to around May-time and this competition always took place early in the season, in the Autumn, with the final taking place in December (The only exception to this was when disruption of the fixture list was caused by inclement weather)

See also 
1974–75 Northern Rugby Football League season
1974 Lancashire Cup
1974 Yorkshire Cup
BBC2 Floodlit Trophy
Rugby league county cups

References

External links
Saints Heritage Society
1896–97 Northern Rugby Football Union season at wigan.rlfans.com 
Hull&Proud Fixtures & Results 1896/1897
Widnes Vikings - One team, one passion Season In Review - 1896-97
The Northern Union at warringtonwolves.org
Huddersfield R L Heritage

BBC2 Floodlit Trophy
BBC2 Floodlit Trophy